Ainsworth State Park is a state park in eastern Multnomah County, Oregon, near Cascade Locks.  It is located in the Columbia River Gorge, adjacent to the Historic Columbia River Highway.  The park  administered by the Oregon Parks and Recreation Department, offers a seasonal, full-service campground, access to Gorge hiking trails beyond park boundaries, and a day-use area.

It is named for John Churchill Ainsworth (1870-1943), a prominent Oregon businessman, Portland banker and chairman of the State Highway Commission from 1931-1932. He donated the land in 1933 that became the park and was a son of pioneer steam-boatman John Commingers Ainsworth.

History

The park was affected by the Eagle Creek Fire, but damage was limited.

Amenities
Full RV hook-up sites
Tent camp sites
Flush toilets
Showers
RV dump station
Picnic areas
Amphitheater
Playgrounds
Park host

See also
 List of Oregon state parks

References

External links
 

State parks of Oregon
Columbia River Gorge
Parks in Multnomah County, Oregon
Historic Columbia River Highway